The Samsung NX 45mm F1.8 is an interchangeable camera lens announced by Samsung on September 17, 2012.

References
045mm F1.8
Camera lenses introduced in 2012